INSAT-3D is a meteorological, data relay and satellite aided search and rescue satellite developed by the Indian Space Research Organisation and was launched successfully on 26 July 2013 using an Ariane 5 ECA launch vehicle from French Guiana. The satellite has many new technology elements like star sensor, micro stepping Solar Array Drive Assembly (SADA) to reduce the spacecraft disturbances and Bus Management Unit (BMU) for control and telecom and telemetry function. It also incorporates new features of bi-annual rotation and Image and Mirror motion compensations for improved performance of the meteorological payloads.

Mission 
The mission goal is stated as "to provide an operational, environmental & storm warning system to protect life & property and also to monitor earth’s surface and carryout oceanic observations and also provide data dissemination capabilities."

Payloads 
The satellite has 4 payloads:
6 channel multi-spectral Imager
19 channel sounder
 Data Relay Transponder (DRT)
 Satellite Aided Search and Rescue (SAS&R)

Launch 
The satellite was expected to be launched using the GSLV Mk-II. On December 4, 2010, ISRO Chairman revealed that ISRO was considering the use of an Ariane 5 ECA launch vehicle for the launch. The launch was successfully carried out on 26 July 2013 from French Guiana. INSAT-3D was launched along with AlphaSat, which is Europe's largest telecommunication satellite.

Footnotes

External links

 INSAT-3D brochure

Weather satellites of India
INSAT satellites
Spacecraft launched in 2013
2013 in India